Niels Dahl may refer to:

 Niels Dahl (sport shooter) (born 1937), Danish sport shooter
 Niels Fredrik Dahl (born 1957), Norwegian novelist, lyricist and dramatist
 Niels Lauritz Dahl (1925–2014), Norwegian diplomat